Neumayer's barb (Enteromius neumayeri) is a species of cyprinid fish.

It is found in Burundi, Kenya, Rwanda, Tanzania, and Uganda.
Its natural habitats are rivers, intermittent rivers, freshwater lakes, freshwater marshes, and inland deltas.
It is not considered a threatened species by the IUCN.

References

Enteromius
Cyprinid fish of Africa
Fish described in 1884
Taxa named by Johann Gustav Fischer
Taxonomy articles created by Polbot